Nostolachma is a genus of flowering plants in the family Rubiaceae. It is found in South Asia and Southeast Asia.

Species
Nostolachma crassifolia 
Nostolachma densiflora 
Nostolachma jenkinsii 
Nostolachma odorata 
Nostolachma triflorum 
Nostolachma viridiflora

References

 
Rubiaceae genera
Taxonomy articles created by Polbot
Taxa named by Théophile Alexis Durand